Alsophila is a genus of tree ferns in the family Cyatheaceae. It has also been considered to be a section in the subgenus Cyathea of the genus Cyathea.

Description
Species of Alsophila have a treelike growth habit, with an erect trunk that rarely branches, or sometimes a more shrublike habit, with a creeping stem. Their fronds are large, with a strawlike stalk (stipe), dark brown or black in colour. Brown or dark brown scales are present, with distinct margins. The blade (lamina) of the frond is divided one to three times (one- to three-pinnate). The sori (spore-producing structures) are rounded and borne on smaller veins on the lower surface of the frond. An indusium (a covering to the sori) may or may not be present; if present initially, it may be lost as the frond ages.

Alsophila is now separated from the other genera in the family Cyatheaceae primarily on the basis of molecular phylogenetic studies. The scales on the stalks (petioles) provide a morphological distinction. Alsophila has scales with distinct margins, unlike Sphaeropteris, and with an apical hair or spine (seta), unlike Cyathea. The ornamentation of the spores also distinguishes Alsophila and Cyathea.

Taxonomy
The genus Alsophila was erected by Robert Brown in 1810. It is placed in the family Cyatheaceae. The division of the family into genera has had a long and controversial history. Three or four clades have been suggested based on molecular phylogenetic studies. The Pteridophyte Phylogeny Group classification of 2016 (PPG I) accepts three genera, placing the Gymnosphaera clade within Alsophila. In 2018, Dong and Zuo proposed the relationship shown in the cladogram below, and provided names in Gymnosphaera for species they considered to belong in this genus.

Older sources, such as the New Zealand Organisms Register  and Large and Braggins (2004), place Alsophila within a broadly defined Cyathea.

Species
The Pteridophyte Phylogeny Group classification of 2016 (PPG I) accepted the genus Alsophila with 275 species. , Plants of the World Online accepted 296 species.

Alsophila abbottii (Maxon) R.M.Tryon (syn. Cyathea abbottii)
Alsophila acanthophora (Holttum) R.M.Tryon (syn. Cyathea acanthophora)
Alsophila acrostichoides Alderw. (syn. Cyathea acrostichoides)
Alsophila acuminata (Copel.) R.M.Tryon (syn. Cyathea acuminata)
Alsophila acutula R.M.Tryon
Alsophila albida (Tardieu) R.M.Tryon
Alsophila albidosquamata (Rosenst.) Lehnert
Alsophila alderwereltii (Copel.) R.M.Tryon (syn. Cyathea alderwereltii)
Alsophila alleniae (Holttum) R.M.Tryon (syn. Cyathea alleniae)
Alsophila alpina Alderw. (syn. Cyathea alpicola)
Alsophila alta (Copel.) R.M.Tryon
Alsophila alternans (Hook.) Hook.
Alsophila alticola (Tardieu) R.M.Tryon
Alsophila amboinensis Alderw. (syn. Cyathea amboinensis)
Alsophila andersonii J.Scott ex Bedd. (syn. Cyathea andersonii)
Alsophila andohahelensis Tardieu
Alsophila aneitensis (Hook.) R.M.Tryon (syn. Cyathea aneitensis)
Alsophila angiensis A.Gepp
Alsophila annae Alderw. (syn. Cyathea annae)
Alsophila apiculata Rosenst. (syn. Cyathea apiculata)
Alsophila apoensis (Copel.) R.M.Tryon (syn. Cyathea apoensis)
Alsophila appendiculata (Baker) R.M.Tryon
Alsophila approximata (Bonap.) R.M.Tryon (syn. Cyathea approximata)
Alsophila archboldii (C.Chr.) R.M.Tryon (syn. Cyathea archboldii)
Alsophila arfakensis A.Gepp (syn. Cyathea kanehirae)
Alsophila atropurpurea (Copel.) C.Chr. (syn. Cyathea atropurpurea)
Alsophila auneae D.S.Conant (syn. Cyathea pubescens)
Alsophila auriculata (Tardieu) R.M.Tryon
Alsophila australis R.Br. (syn. Cyathea australis)
Alsophila austroyunnanensis S.G.Lu
Alsophila baileyana Domin (syn. Cyathea baileyana)
Alsophila balanocarpa (D.C.Eaton) D.S.Conant (syn. Cyathea balanocarpa)
Alsophila baroumba L.Linden
Alsophila basirotundata (Rakotondr. & Janssen) Christenh.
Alsophila batjanensis Christ (syn. Cyathea batjanensis)
Alsophila bellisquamata (Bonap.) R.M.Tryon
Alsophila biformis Rosenst. (syns Alsophila lilianiae, Cyathea biformis)
Alsophila binayana (M.Kato) Lehnert & Coritico
Alsophila bisquamata (M.Kato) Lehnert & Coritico
Alsophila boivinii Mett. ex Ettingsh. (syn. Alsophila boiviniiformis)
Alsophila borbonica (Desv.) R.M.Tryon
Alsophila borneensis (Copel.) R.M.Tryon (syn. Cyathea borneensis)
Alsophila × boytelii Caluff & Shelton
Alsophila brachyphylla (Holttum) Lehnert
Alsophila brausei R.M.Tryon (syn. Cyathea hunsteiniana)
Alsophila brevipinna (Benth.) R.M.Tryon (syn. Cyathea brevipinna)
Alsophila brooksii (Maxon) R.M.Tryon (syn. Cyathea brooksii)
Alsophila bryophila R.M.Tryon (syn. Cyathea bryophila)
Alsophila buennemeijeri (Alderw.) R.M.Tryon
Alsophila bullata Baker
Alsophila calcicola Lehnert
Alsophila callosa (Christ) R.M.Tryon (syn. Cyathea callosa)
Alsophila camerooniana (Hook.) R.M.Tryon (syn. Cyathea camerooniana)
Alsophila capensis (L.f.) J.Sm. (syn. Cyathea capensis)
Alsophila catillifera (Holttum) R.M.Tryon (syn. Cyathea catillifera)
Alsophila celebica (Blume) Mett.
Alsophila celsa R.M.Tryon
Alsophila cicatricosa (Holttum) R.M.Tryon
Alsophila cincinnata (Brause) R.M.Tryon (syn. Cyathea cincinnata)
Alsophila cinerea (Copel.) R.M.Tryon (syn. Cyathea cinerea)
Alsophila coactilis (Holttum) R.M.Tryon (syn. Cyathea coactilis)
Alsophila colensoi Hook.f. (syn. Cyathea colensoi)
Alsophila commutata Mett. (syn. Cyathea recommutata)
Alsophila conantiana Lehnert
Alsophila conferta (Janssen & Rakotondr.) Christenh.
Alsophila confinis (C.Chr.) R.M.Tryon
Alsophila costalisora (Copel.) R.M.Tryon (syn. Cyathea costalisora)
Alsophila costularis Baker
Alsophila coursii Tardieu
Alsophila crassicaula R.M.Tryon
Alsophila crenulata Mett. ex Hook (syn. Cyathea raciborskii)
Alsophila crinita Hook.
Alsophila cubensis (Underw. ex Maxon) Caluff & Shelton
Alsophila cucullifera (Holttum) R.M.Tryon (syn. Cyathea cucullifera)
Alsophila cunninghamii (Hook.f.) R.M.Tryon (syn. Cyathea cunninghamii)
Alsophila cuspidata (Kunze) D.S.Conant (syn. Cyathea cuspidata)
Alsophila deckenii (Kuhn & Decken) R.M.Tryon (syn. Cyathea deckenii)
Alsophila decrescens (Mett.) R.M.Tryon (syn. Cyathea decrescens)
Alsophila decurrens Hook.
Alsophila denticulata Baker (syns Alsophila acaulis, Cyathea hancockii)
Alsophila dicksonioides (Holttum) R.M.Tryon (syn. Cyathea dicksonioides)
Alsophila dilatata (Rakotondr. & Janssen) Christenh.
Alsophila dimorpha Christ (syn. Cyathea dimorpha)
Alsophila doctersii (Alderw.) R.M.Tryon (syn. Cyathea doctersii)
Alsophila dregei (Kunze) R.M.Tryon (syn. Cyathea dregei)
Alsophila dryopteroides (Maxon) R.M.Tryon (syn. Cyathea dryopteroides)
Alsophila edanoi (Copel.) R.M.Tryon (syn. Cyathea edanoi)
Alsophila elata O.G.Martínez
Alsophila emilei (Janssen & Rakotondr.) Christenh.
Alsophila engelii R.M.Tryon (syn. Cyathea elongata)
Alsophila erinacea (H.Karst.) D.S.Conant (syn. Cyathea erinacea)
Alsophila eriophora (Holttum) R.M.Tryon (syn. Cyathea eriophora)
Alsophila esmeraldensis R.C.Moran
Alsophila everta (Copel.) R.M.Tryon (syn. Cyathea everta)
Alsophila excavata (Holttum) R.M.Tryon (syn. Cyathea excavata)
Alsophila excelsior Lehnert
Alsophila exilis (Holttum) Lehnert
Alsophila × fagildei Caluff & Shelton
Alsophila fenicis (Copel.) C.Chr. (syn. Cyathea fenicis)
Alsophila ferdinandii R.M.Tryon (syn. Cyathea macarthurii)
Alsophila ferruginea (Christ) R.M.Tryon (syn. Cyathea ferruginea)
Alsophila firma (Baker) D.S.Conant (syn. Cyathea mexicana)
Alsophila foersteri (Rosenst.) R.M.Tryon (syn. Cyathea foersteri)
Alsophila fulgens (C.Chr.) D.S.Conant (syn. Cyathea fulgens)
Alsophila fuliginosa Christ (syn. Cyathea fuliginosa)
Alsophila gastonyi Lehnert
Alsophila geluensis (Rosenst.) R.M.Tryon (syn. Cyathea geluensis)
Alsophila gigantea Wall. ex Hook. (syn. Cyathea gigantea)
Alsophila glaberrima (Holttum) R.M.Tryon (syn. Cyathea glaberrima)
Alsophila glabra (Blume) Hook. (syn. Cyathea glabra)
Alsophila glaucifolia R.M.Tryon
Alsophila gleichenioides (C.Chr.) R.M.Tryon (syn. Cyathea gleichenioides)
Alsophila grangaudiana (Janssen & Rakotondr.) J.P.Roux
Alsophila gregaria Brause (syn. Cyathea gregaria)
Alsophila grevilleana (Mart.) D.S.Conant (syn. Cyathea grevilleana)
Alsophila halconensis (Christ) R.M.Tryon (syn. Cyathea halconensis)
Alsophila havilandii (Baker) R.M.Tryon (syn. Cyathea havilandii)
Alsophila hebes (Janssen & Rakotondr.) Christenh.
Alsophila henryi Baker (syn. Cyathea henryi)
Alsophila hermannii R.M.Tryon (syn. Cyathea christii)
Alsophila heterochlamydea (Copel.) R.M.Tryon (syn. Cyathea heterochlamydea)
Alsophila hildebrandtii (Kuhn) R.M.Tryon
Alsophila hooglandii (Holttum) R.M.Tryon (syn. Cyathea hooglandii)
Alsophila hookeri (Thwaites) R.M.Tryon (syn. Cyathea hookeri)
Alsophila hornei Baker (syn. Cyathea hornei)
Alsophila horridula (Copel.) R.M.Tryon (syn. Cyathea horridula)
Alsophila hotteana (C.Chr. & Ekman) R.M.Tryon (syn. Cyathea hotteana)
Alsophila humbertiana (C.Chr.) R.M.Tryon
Alsophila humilis (Hieron.) Pic.Serm. (syn. Cyathea humilis)
Alsophila hyacinthei R.M.Tryon
Alsophila hymenodes (Mett.) R.M.Tryon (syn. Cyathea hymenodes)
Alsophila imbricata (Alderw.) R.M.Tryon (syn. Cyathea imbricata)
Alsophila impolita (Rakotondr. & Janssen) Christenh.
Alsophila imrayana (Hook.) D.S.Conant (syn. Cyathea imrayana)
Alsophila incisoserrata (Copel.) C.Chr. (syn. Cyathea incisoserrata)
Alsophila indiscriminata Lehnert
Alsophila inquinans (Christ) R.M.Tryon (syn. Cyathea inquinans)
Alsophila insulana (Holttum) R.M.Tryon (syn. Cyathea insulana)
Alsophila isaloensis (C.Chr.) R.M.Tryon
Alsophila ivohibensis (C.Chr.) Christenh.
Alsophila javanica (Blume) R.M.Tryon (syn. Cyathea javanica)
Alsophila jimeneziana D.S.Conant (syn. Cyathea crassa)
Alsophila jivariensis Hieron.
Alsophila johnsii Lehnert
Alsophila junghuhniana Kunze (syn. Cyathea junghuhniana)
Alsophila katoi Lehnert & Coritico
Alsophila kermadecensis (W.R.B.Oliv.) R.M.Tryon (syn. Cyathea kermadecensis)
Alsophila khasyana T.Moore ex Kuhn (syn. Cyathea khasyana)
Alsophila kirkii (Hook.) R.M.Tryon
Alsophila klossii (Ridl.) R.M.Tryon (syn. Cyathea klossii)
Alsophila lamoureuxii (W.N.Takeuchi) Lehnert & Coritico
Alsophila lastii (Baker) R.M.Tryon
Alsophila latebrosa Wall. ex Hook. (syn. Cyathea latebrosa)
Alsophila latipinnula (Copel.) R.M.Tryon (syn. Cyathea latipinnula)
Alsophila leichhardtiana F.Muell.
Alsophila lepidoclada Christ (syn. Cyathea lepidoclada)
Alsophila leptochlamys (Baker) R.M.Tryon
Alsophila ligulata (Baker) R.M.Tryon
Alsophila lisyae (Janssen & Rakotondr.) Christenh.
Alsophila loerzingii (Holttum) R.M.Tryon (syn. Cyathea loerzingii)
Alsophila loheri (Christ) R.M.Tryon (syn. Cyathea loheri)
Alsophila longipes (Copel.) R.M.Tryon (syn. Cyathea longipes)
Alsophila longipinnata (Bonap.) R.M.Tryon
Alsophila longispina (Janssen & Rakotondr.) Christenh.
Alsophila loubetiana L.Linden
Alsophila lurida (Blume) Hook. (syn. Cyathea lurida)
Alsophila macgillivrayi Baker (syn. Cyathea macgillivrayi)
Alsophila macgregorii (F.Muell.) R.M.Tryon (syn. Cyathea macgregorii)
Alsophila macropoda (Domin) R.M.Tryon (syn. Cyathea macropoda)
Alsophila madagascarica Bonap.
Alsophila magnifolia (Alderw.) R.M.Tryon (syn. Cyathea magnifolia)
Alsophila major Caluff & Shelton
Alsophila manniana (Hook.) R.M.Tryon (syn. Cyathea manniana)
Alsophila mapahuwensis (M.Kato) Lehnert & Coritico
Alsophila marattioides (Willd. ex Kaulf.) R.M.Tryon (syn. Cyathea marattioides)
Alsophila × marcescens (N.A.Wakef.) R.M.Tryon (syn. Cyathea × marcescens)
Alsophila masapilidensis (Copel.) R.M.Tryon (syn. Cyathea masapilidensis)
Alsophila matitanensis R.M.Tryon (syn. Cyathea madagascarica)
Alsophila media (W.H.Wagner & Grether) R.M.Tryon (syn. Cyathea media)
Alsophila × medinae Caluff & Shelton (syn. Cyathea × medinae)
Alsophila melleri (Domin) R.M.Tryon
Alsophila meridionalis (Janssen & Rakotondr.) Christenh.
Alsophila metteniana Hance (syn. Cyathea metteniana)
Alsophila micra R.M.Tryon
Alsophila microchlamys (Holttum) R.M.Tryon (syn. Cyathea microchlamys)
Alsophila microphylloides (Rosenst.) R.M.Tryon (syn. Cyathea microphylloides)
Alsophila mildbraedii Brause (syn. Cyathea mildbraedii)
Alsophila milnei (Hook.f.) R.M.Tryon (syn. Cyathea milnei)
Alsophila minervae Lehnert
Alsophila minor (D.C.Eaton) R.M.Tryon (syn. Cyathea minor)
Alsophila modesta Baker (syn. Cyathea modesta)
Alsophila monosticha Christ
Alsophila montana (Alderw.) R.M.Tryon (syn. Cyathea costulisora)
Alsophila mossambicensis (Baker) R.M.Tryon (syn. Cyathea mossambicensis)
Alsophila mostellaria Lehnert
Alsophila muelleri (Baker) R.M.Tryon (syn. Cyathea muelleri)
Alsophila murkelensis (M.Kato) Lehnert & Coritico
Alsophila nebulosa Lehnert
Alsophila negrosiana (Christ) R.M.Tryon (syn. Cyathea negrosiana)
Alsophila nicklesii (Tardieu & F.Ballard) R.M.Tryon (syn. Cyathea nicklesii)
Alsophila nigrolineata (Holttum) R.M.Tryon (syn. Cyathea nigrolineata)
Alsophila nigropaleata (Holttum) R.M.Tryon (syn. Cyathea nigropaleata)
Alsophila nilgirensis (Holttum) R.M.Tryon (syn. Cyathea nilgirensis)
Alsophila nockii (Jenman) R.M.Tryon (syn. Cyathea nockii)
Alsophila nothofagorum (Holttum) Lehnert
Alsophila novabrittanica Lehnert
Alsophila obtecta (Rakotondr. & Janssen) Christenh.
Alsophila obtusiloba Hook. (syn. Cyathea obtusiloba)
Alsophila odonelliana (Alston) Lehnert
Alsophila ogurae Hayata (syn. Cyathea ogurae)
Alsophila ohaensis (M.Kato) Lehnert & Coritico
Alsophila oinops (Hassk.) R.M.Tryon (syn. Cyathea oinops)
Alsophila oosora (Holttum) R.M.Tryon (syn. Cyathea oosora)
Alsophila orientalis (T.Moore) R.M.Tryon (syn. Cyathea orientalis)
Alsophila orthogonalis (Bonap.) R.M.Tryon
Alsophila pachyrrhachis (Copel.) R.M.Tryon (syn. Cyathea pachyrrhachis)
Alsophila pacifica Christenh.
Alsophila pallidipaleata (Holttum) R.M.Tryon (syn. Cyathea pallidipaleata)
Alsophila parrisiae Lehnert
Alsophila patellifera (Alderw.) R.M.Tryon (syn. Cyathea patellifera)
Alsophila percrassa (C.Chr.) R.M.Tryon (syn. Cyathea percrassa)
Alsophila perpelvigera (Alderw.) R.M.Tryon (syn. Cyathea perpelvigera)
Alsophila perpunctulata (Alderw.) R.M.Tryon (syn. Cyathea perpunctulata)
Alsophila perrieriana (C.Chr.) R.M.Tryon (syn. Cyathea perrieriana)
Alsophila phlebodes Lehnert & Coritico
Alsophila physolepidota (Alston) R.M.Tryon (syn. Cyathea physolepidota)
Alsophila pilosula (Tardieu) R.M.Tryon
Alsophila plagiostegia (Copel.) R.M.Tryon (syn. Cyathea plagiostegia)
Alsophila podophylla Hook. (syn. Cyathea podophylla)
Alsophila polycarpa (Jungh.) R.M.Tryon (syn. Cyathea polycarpa)
Alsophila polystichoides Christ (syn. Cyathea polystichoides)
Alsophila poolii C.Chr.
Alsophila portoricensis (Kuhn) D.S.Conant (syn. Cyathea portoricensis)
Alsophila pruinosa (Rosenst.) R.M.Tryon (syn. Cyathea pruinosa)
Alsophila pseudobellisquamara (Janssen & Rakotondr.) Christenh.
Alsophila pseudomuelleri (Holttum) R.M.Tryon (syn. Cyathea pseudomuelleri)
Alsophila punctulata Alderw. (syn. Cyathea punctulata)
Alsophila pycnoneura (Holttum) R.M.Tryon (syn. Cyathea pycnoneura)
Alsophila quadrata (Baker) R.M.Tryon
Alsophila ramispina Hook. (syn. Cyathea ramispina)
Alsophila ramispinoides Lehnert
Alsophila rebeccae F.Muell. (syn. Cyathea rebeccae)
Alsophila recurvata Brause (syn. Cyathea recurvata)
Alsophila rigens (Rosenst.) R.M.Tryon (syn. Cyathea rigens)
Alsophila rolandii R.M.Tryon
Alsophila roroka (Hovenkamp) Lehnert & Coritico
Alsophila rosenstockii Brause (syn. Cyathea ascendens)
Alsophila rouhaniana (Rakotondr. & Janssen) Christenh.
Alsophila rubella (Holttum) R.M.Tryon (syn. Cyathea rubella)
Alsophila rubiginosa Brause (syn. Cyathea rubiginosa)
Alsophila rufopannosa (Christ) R.M.Tryon (syn. Cyathea rufopannosa)
Alsophila rupestris (Maxon) Gastony & R.M.Tryon (syn. Cyathea rupestris)
Alsophila saccata (Christ) R.M.Tryon (syn. Cyathea saccata)
Alsophila salletii (Tardieu & C.Chr.) R.M.Tryon (syn. Cyathea salletii)
Alsophila salvinii Hook. (syn. Cyathea salvinii)
Alsophila scandens Brause (syn. Cyathea scandens)
Alsophila schlechteri Brause (syn. Cyathea schlechteri)
Alsophila schliebenii Reimers (syn. Cyathea fadenii)
Alsophila sechellarum (Mett.) R.M.Tryon (syn. Cyathea sechellarum)
Alsophila semiamplectens (Holttum) R.M.Tryon (syn. Cyathea semiamplectens)
Alsophila serratifolia (Baker) R.M.Tryon (syn. Cyathea serratifolia)
Alsophila setosa Kaulf. (syn. Cyathea setosa)
Alsophila setulosa (Copel.) R.M.Tryon (syn. Cyathea setulosa)
Alsophila similis (C.Chr.) R.M.Tryon
Alsophila simulans Baker
Alsophila sinuata (Hook. & Grev.) R.M.Tryon (syn. Cyathea sinuata)
Alsophila smithii (Hook.f.) R.M.Tryon (syn. Cyathea smithii)
Alsophila societarum (Baker) Christenh.
Alsophila solomonensis (Holttum) R.M.Tryon (syn. Cyathea solomonensis)
Alsophila speciosa C.Presl (syns Alsophila caudata, Cyathea caudata)
Alsophila spinulosa (Wall. ex Hook.) R.M.Tryon (syn. Cyathea spinulosa)
Alsophila stelligera (Holttum) R.M.Tryon
Alsophila sternbergii (Pohl) D.S.Conant
Alsophila stokesii (E.Brown) R.M.Tryon
Alsophila subdubia Alderw. (syn. Cyathea subdubia)
Alsophila subtripinnata (Holttum) R.M.Tryon (syn. Cyathea subtripinnata)
Alsophila sumatrana (Baker) R.M.Tryon (syn. Cyathea sumatrana)
Alsophila sundueana Lehnert
Alsophila suprasora Panigrahi & Sarn.Singh
Alsophila tanzaniana R.M.Tryon (syn. Cyathea schliebenii)
Alsophila telefominensis Lehnert
Alsophila tenuis Brause (syn. Cyathea tenuicaulis)
Alsophila ternatea (Alderw.) R.M.Tryon (syn. Cyathea ternatea)
Alsophila thomsonii (Baker) R.M.Tryon (syn. Cyathea thomsonii)
Alsophila tryoniana (Gastony) D.S.Conant (syn. Cyathea tryoniana)
Alsophila tsaratananensis (C.Chr.) R.M.Tryon
Alsophila tsilotsilensis (Tardieu) R.M.Tryon (syn. Cyathea tsilotsilensis)
Alsophila tussacii (Desv.) D.S.Conant (syn. Cyathea tussacii)
Alsophila tuyamae (H.Ohba) Nakaike
Alsophila urbani (Brause) R.M.Tryon (syn. Cyathea urbanii)
Alsophila valdesquamata (Janssen & Rakotondr.) Christenh.
Alsophila vandeusenii (Holttum) R.M.Tryon (syn. Cyathea vandeusenii)
Alsophila veitchii Baker
Alsophila vieillardii (Mett.) R.M.Tryon (syn. Cyathea vieillardii)
Alsophila viguieri (Tardieu) R.M.Tryon
Alsophila walkerae (Hook.) J.Sm. (syn. Cyathea walkerae)
Alsophila weidenbrueckii Lehnert
Alsophila welwitschii (Hook.) R.M.Tryon (syn. Cyathea welwitschii)
Alsophila wengiensis Brause (syn. Cyathea wengiensis)
Alsophila woodwardioides (Kaulf.) D.S.Conant (syn. Cyathea woodwardioides)
Alsophila woollsiana F.Muell. (syn. Cyathea woollsiana)
Alsophila zakamenensis (Tardieu) R.M.Tryon (syn. Cyathea zakamenensis

Distribution and habitat
The genus Alsophila is native in tropical and subtropical areas, from North and South America, through Africa, Madagascar and tropical Asia, to eastern Australasia as far south as the subantarctic Auckland Islands. It is found in moist montane forests, on slopes or in ravines, forming part of the lower canopy, middle understorey, or ground layers.

Cultivation
Alsophila species all require frost-free or virtually frost-free, permanently moist, shaded conditions. Those which have been grown in Europe outside their native habitat include A. australis, A. cunninghamii, A. dealbata, A. leichhardtiana and A. rebeccae. Other species are grown in their native regions. In Australia, A. australis is commonly grown and is a robust species, capable of tolerating some sun if kept in moist soil. A. dregei is a popular garden plant in South Africa, with plants being collected for use from the wild sufficiently often to cause it to become extinct in some areas.

Culture
The silver fern, Alsophila dealbata has become a widely recognised symbol of New Zealand, although it is not an official national symbol.

In the 1971 comedy film A New Leaf, Henrietta Lowell (played by Elaine May) is a botanist whose dream is to classify a new species of fern. On a honeymoon trip, she indeed discovers a new species which she names Alsophila grahami after her new husband Henry Graham (Walter Matthau). She describes the plant as having a vestigial indusium.

References

 
Fern genera